The Diocesan Seminary of Our Lady of the Pillar is the collegiate seminary of the Diocese of Imus located in Buhay na Tubig, Imus, Cavite in the Philippines. The seminary sits on 2.6-hectare lot.

The Seminary was established in 1970 through the efforts of Imus Bishop Felix Paz Perez. The seminary used to have a high school department which was phased out at some time.

References

Seminaries and theological colleges in the Philippines
Education in Imus